= Bansiya, Bhopal =

Bansiya Bansia
- village
- Location within Madhya Pradesh Location within India
- Coordinates: 23.220475°N 77.553397°E
- Country: India
- State: Madhya Pradesh
- District: Bhopal
- Tehsil: Huzur

Population (2011)
  - Total: 787
- Time zone: UTC+5:30 (IST)
- ISO 3166 code: MP-IN
- Census code: 482440

Bansiya is a village in the Bhopal district of Madhya Pradesh, India. It is located in the Huzur tehsil and the Phanda block.

== Demographics ==
According to the 2011 census of India, Bansiya has 149 households. The effective literacy rate (i.e. the literacy rate of population excluding children aged 6 and below) is 73.19%.

Demographics (2011 Census)
	Total	Male	Female
Population	787	425	362
Children aged below 6 years	153	86	67
Scheduled caste	60	31	29
Scheduled tribe	191	103	88
Literates	464	284	180
Workers (all)	220	198	22
Main workers (total)	220	198	22
Main workers: Cultivators	115	109	6
Main workers: Agricultural labourers	98	85	13
Main workers: Household industry workers	0	0	0
Main workers: Other	7	4	3
Marginal workers (total)	0	0	0
Marginal workers: Cultivators	0	0	0
Marginal workers: Agricultural labourers	0	0	0
Marginal workers: Household industry workers	0	0	0
Marginal workers: Others	0	0	0
Non-workers	567	227	340
